The La Cabrera Tunnel, also known as the La Cabrera bridge-tunnel, is a tunnel and viaduct in Venezuela which lies within Carabobo State and connects it with Aragua State.  It was built in the late 1950s using the New Austrian Tunnelling method.  It was the first application by Ladislaus von Rabcewicz of systematic rock bolt and shotcrete support in a highway tunnel.

In July 2016, it was reported that the viaduct which leads to the tunnel was in danger of collapse and that multiple vehicles had fallen off due to a lack of guardrails combined with swerving to avoid potholes.

References

Tunnels in Venezuela
Buildings and structures in Carabobo
Buildings and structures in Aragua